The ward of Hipperholme and Lightcliffe in the metropolitan borough of Calderdale, West Yorkshire, England, consists of the villages of Hipperholme and Lightcliffe together with the surrounding area. The ward contains 71 listed buildings that are recorded in the National Heritage List for England. Of these, three are at Grade II*, the middle of the three grades, and the others are at Grade II, the lowest grade. In addition to the villages of Hipperholme and Lightcliffe, the ward contains smaller settlements, including Bailiff Bridge, Coley, Hove Edge, and Norwood Green, and is otherwise rural. Most of the listed buildings are houses and associated structures, cottages, farmhouses and farm buildings. The other listed buildings include churches and an associated structures, a surviving tower from a former church, public houses, a school, a railway viaduct, a bridge, a milestone, a boundary stone and a war memorial.


Key

Buildings

References

Citations

Sources

Lists of listed buildings in West Yorkshire